Tatiana Kozlova (born November 26, 1986) is a Russian orienteering and ski-orienteering competitor and junior world champion in both sports.

Orienteering
She won a gold medal in the relay at the 2006 Junior World Orienteering Championships in Druskininkai, together with Ekaterina Terekhova and Maria Shilova. She finished 5th in the long course at the 2006 junior world championship.

Ski orienteering
Kozlova received a bronze medal in sprint at the 2007 World Ski Orienteering Championships (shared with Liisa Anttila).

She received two individual gold medals and one silver medal at the Junior World Ski Orienteering Championships in Ivanovo in 2006.

References

1986 births
Living people
Russian orienteers
Female orienteers
Ski-orienteers
Foot orienteers
21st-century Russian women
Junior World Orienteering Championships medalists